These are the awards and nominations received by Alt-J, an English indie rock band.

Awards and nominations
{| class="wikitable sortable plainrowheaders" 
|-
! scope="col" | Award
! scope="col" | Year
! scope="col" | Category
! scope="col" | Nominee(s)
! scope="col" | Result
! scope="col" class="unsortable"| 
|-
! scope="row" rowspan=7|AIM Independent Music Awards
| 2012
| Independent Breakthrough of the Year 
| rowspan=4|Themselves
| 
|
|-
| rowspan=2|2013
| Most Played New Independent Act 
| 
|rowspan=2|
|-
| Hardest Working Band or Artist 
| 
|-
| rowspan=3|2015
| Best Live Act
| 
|rowspan=2|
|-
| Independent Track of the Year 
| "Every Other Freckle"
| 
|-
| Independent Video of the Year
| "Hunger of the Pine"
| 
|
|-
| 2017
| Independent Album of the Year
| Relaxer
| 
|
|-
! scope="row" rowspan=3|Berlin Music Video Awards
|rowspan=3|2018
| Best Cinematography
| "3WW"
| 
|rowspan=3| 
|-
| Best Concept
| "In Cold Blood"
| 
|-
| Best Direction
| "Pleader"
| 
|-
! scope="row" rowspan=5|Brit Awards
| rowspan=3|2013
| British Breakthrough Act
| rowspan=2|Themselves
| 
|rowspan=3|
|-
| British Group
| 
|-
| rowspan=2|British Album of the Year
| An Awesome Wave
| 
|-
| rowspan=2|2015
| This Is All Yours
| 
|rowspan=2|
|-
| British Group
| Themselves
| 
|-
! scope="row" rowspan=4|Camerimage
| rowspan=3|2017
| rowspan=2|Best Music Video
| "3WW"
| 
|rowspan=2|
|-
| rowspan=2|"In Cold Blood"
|
|-
| Best Cinematography
| 
|
|-
| 2018
| Best Music Video
| "Pleader"
| 
| 
|-
! scope="row"|D&AD Awards
| 2018
| Best Cinematography
|"3WW" 
| style="background:#BF8040"| Wood Pencil
| 
|-
! scope="row" rowspan=3|European Festival Awards
| 2012
| Newcomer of the Year
| rowspan=2|Themselves
| 
|
|-
|rowspan=2|2015
| Headliner of the Year
| 
|
|-
| Festival Anthem of the Year
| "Left Hand Free"
| 
|
|-
! scope="row" | Grammy Awards
| 2015
| Best Alternative Music Album
| This Is All Yours
| 
|
|-
! scope="row" rowspan=3|Ivor Novello Awards
| rowspan=2|2013
| Album Award
| An Awesome Wave
| 
|rowspan=2|
|-
| rowspan=2|Best Contemporary Song
| "Fitzpleasure"
| 
|-
| 2015
| "Every Other Freckle"
| 
|
|-
! scope="row" rowspan=2| MTV Video Music Awards
| 2013
| Best Art Direction
| "Tessellate"
| 
|
|-
| 2015
| Best Cinematography
| "Left Hand Free"
| 
|
|-
! scope="row" rowspan=2|Mercury Prize
| 2012
| rowspan=2|Album of the Year
| An Awesome Wave
| 
|
|-
| 2017
| Relaxer
| 
|
|-
! scope="row"|Music Producers Guild Awards
| 2018
| UK Album of the Year
| Relaxer
| 
|
|-
!scope="row"|Music Video Festival
| 2013
| Best International Video
| "Breezeblocks"
| 
| 
|-
! scope="row" rowspan=5| NME Awards
| rowspan=3|2013
| Best Album
| An Awesome Wave 
| 
|rowspan=3|
|-
| Best New Band
| rowspan=5|Themselves
| 
|-
| Worst Band
| 
|-
| 2015
| rowspan=2|Best British Band
| 
|
|-
| 2018
| 
|
|-
! scope="row"|Q Awards
| 2012
| Best New Act
| 
|
|-
! scope="row" rowspan=6|Shark Music Video Awards
| rowspan=6|2018
| Best Cinematography
| rowspan=6|"Pleader"
| 
|rowspan=6|
|-
| Best Color Grading 
| 
|-
| Best Direction 
| 
|-
| Best Post Production SFX
| 
|-
| Best Production Design
| 
|-
| Best Music Video
| 
|-
! scope="row" rowspan=20|UK Music Video Awards
| rowspan=2|2012
| Best Alternative Video - UK
| "Breezeblocks"
| 
|rowspan=2|
|-
| Best Indie/Rock Video - UK 
| "Tessellate"
| 
|-
| rowspan=3|2014
| Best Visual Effects in a Video 
| rowspan=3|"Hunger of the Pine"
| 
|rowspan=3|
|-
| Best Colour Grade in a Video 
| 
|-
| rowspan=1|Best Alternative Video – UK 
| 
|-
| rowspan=3|2016
| Best Artist
| Themselves
|
|rowspan=3|
|-
| rowspan=5|Best Alternative Video – UK 
| "Pusher"
| 
|-
| "Every Other Freckle"
| 
|-
| rowspan=7|2017
| "Deadcrush"
| 
|rowspan=2|
|-
| "In Cold Blood"
| 
|-
| rowspan=2|"3WW"
| 
| rowspan=2|
|-
| Best Cinematography in a Video 
| 
|-
| Best Artist
| Themselves
| 
| rowspan=3|
|-
| Best Choreography in a Video 
| rowspan=2|"Deadcrush"
| 
|-
| rowspan=2|Best Editing in a Video 
| 
|-
| rowspan=3|2018
| rowspan=3|"Pleader"
| 
|rowspan=3|
|-
| Best Colour Grading in a Video 
| 
|-
| rowspan=2|Best Alternative Video - UK 
| 
|-
| rowspan=2|2022
| "Hard Drive Gold"
| 
| rowspan=2|
|-
| Best Choreography in a Video
| "The Actor"
| 
|-
! scope="row"|Webby Awards
| 2018
| Best Art Direction
| "Pleader"
| 
|
|-
! scope="row"|YouTube Music Awards
| 2015
| 50 Artists to Watch 
| Themselves
| 
|

References 

Awards
Lists of awards received by British musician
Lists of awards received by musical group